Rimmel is an album by Italian singer-songwriter Francesco De Gregori. It was released in 1975 by RCA Italia and is generally considered among De Gregori's finest works, containing some of his most popular songs, such as "Rimmel", "Pablo" and "Buonanotte fiorellino”.

Album

The LP was well received both by critics and the public, and established De Gregori as one of the most popular singer-songwriters in his country. It was one of the best selling albums in Italy in 1975, with over 500,000 copies sold.

The song "Le storie di ieri", though written by De Gregori, was first recorded by Fabrizio De André as part of his 1974 album Volume 8, which he co-wrote with De Gregori. The two versions have minor lyrical differences.

Lucio Dalla is credited as co-author of the music for "Pablo".

Track listing
 "Rimmel" (3:39)
"Pezzi di vetro" (3:06)
"Il Signor Hood" (3:11)
"Pablo" (4:22)
"Buonanotte fiorellino" (2:05)
"Le storie di ieri" (4:08)
"Quattro cani" (3:14)
"Piccola mela"  (2:42)
"Piano bar" (2:41)

References

1975 albums
Francesco De Gregori albums
Italian-language albums